The Malčius is a river of  Kėdainiai district municipality, Kaunas County, central Lithuania. It starts in the Lančiūnava-Šventybrastis Forest and flows mostly southwards. It meets the Obelis river (from the right side) by Aristavėlė village.

All the course is channelized. Malčius passes through Pliupai, Stebuliai, Katkai, Aristava and Aristavėlė villages. Several ponds (Malčius, Aristavėlė 1st, Aristavėlė 2nd) are on the Malčius river.

The hydronym derives from Lithuanian verbs malšyti, malšinti ('to still, to quieten'), malšti ('to become still, to relent').

References

Rivers of Lithuania
Kėdainiai District Municipality